Adir Sharabi (born 8 October 1977) is a former Israeli footballer.

Sharabi started playing in the youth department of Maccabi Shaarayim. In 1992 he moved to Maccabi Tel Aviv youth department. In 1995 he began playing for Maccabi Shaarayim senior team, for two years. In 1997 he played for Beitar Beer Sheva from the Liga Leumit. In 1998 he played for Maccabi Ironi Ashdod from the Israeli Premier League.

Honours
Toto Cup (1):
2008–09

External links
 

1977 births
Living people
Israeli Jews
Israeli footballers
Maccabi Sha'arayim F.C. players
Beitar Be'er Sheva F.C. players
Maccabi Ironi Ashdod F.C. players
F.C. Ashdod players
Hapoel Ramat Gan F.C. players
Hapoel Marmorek F.C. players
Sektzia Ness Ziona F.C. players
Maccabi Yavne F.C. players
Footballers from Rehovot
Liga Leumit players
Israeli Premier League players
Israeli people of Yemeni-Jewish descent
Association football midfielders